Samuel Goldwyn Television was the American television production/distribution division of The Samuel Goldwyn Company. Formed in 1979 by Samuel Goldwyn Jr., the company's best-known series was the competition series American Gladiators, which was produced and distributed by the company from 1989 to 1996. In 1987, Samuel Goldwyn Television bought Victor Alexander's movie Kill Zone, which was turned into the 18-picture package The Explosives. The library of Samuel Goldwyn Television also included some episodes of the series Flipper, Gentle Ben, The Mothers-in-Law and The New Adventures of Flipper.
 
On 22 December 1996, hours after PolyGram had made an acquisition offer that was accepted, Metromedia made a counter-offer for Goldwyn's film and television library, and won the bid. Samuel Goldwyn Television was merged into Orion Pictures. In 1997, it was sold to MGM Television and folded later in the year.

Titles by Samuel Goldwyn Television 
 Flipper (1964–1967) (Distributor)
 GamePro TV (1990-1991) (Distributor)
 American Gladiators (1989–1996) (Distributor)
 Why Didn't I Think of That? (1992)
 Gladiators 2000 (1994–1996)
 Wild West Showdown (1994)
 Flipper (Flipper – The New Adventures) (1995–2000) (1995–1997 SGTV, 1998–2000 MGM TV)

Footnotes 

  The rights to Flipper were later acquired by The Samuel Goldwyn Company, and in turn acquired by MGM Television (the company that originally produced the series). MGM owns full rights to the series; the series copyright is held by MGM's subsidiary Orion Pictures (whose own holdings include the Goldwyn library).

References

Television production companies of the United States
Defunct film and television production companies of the United States
Entertainment companies based in California
Companies based in Los Angeles
Entertainment companies established in 1979
Mass media companies established in 1979
Mass media companies disestablished in 1997
1979 establishments in California
1997 disestablishments in California
Defunct companies based in Greater Los Angeles
Former Metro-Goldwyn-Mayer subsidiaries